Cothurnocystidae is an extinct family of stylophoran echinoderms in the order Cornuta.

References

External links 
 
 
 Cothurnocystidae at fossilworks.org (retrieved 16 April 2016)

Homalozoa
Prehistoric echinoderm families